Marco Rose (born 11 September 1976) is a German professional football manager who is currently the manager of Bundesliga club RB Leipzig, and a former player who was a defender for Lokomotive Leipzig, Hannover 96 and Mainz 05. 

He coached Mainz 05's second team, then Lokomotive Leipzig, before going through the ranks at Red Bull Salzburg. After winning the UEFA Youth League, he became the first-team manager in 2017, winning the Austrian Bundesliga in both of his seasons and the Austrian Cup for a double in 2019. He then managed in the German Bundesliga at Borussia Mönchengladbach, Borussia Dortmund and RB Leipzig.

Playing career

The defender started his career at Rotation Leipzig, then joined Lokomotive Leipzig, later renamed VfB Leipzig. Rose played ten games in the second flight for VfB. In 2000, Rose joined Hannover 96. When Hannover reached promotion to the Bundesliga in 2002, Rose went to Jürgen Klopp's Mainz 05 on loan. When Mainz won promotion to the Bundesliga, they signed Rose permanently. Rose retired after 199 games for Mainz's first and second team. He scored seven goals, three of them in the Bundesliga.

Coaching career

Early career
Rose started his career as assistant coach and player of Mainz's second team in the 2010–11 season. For the 2012–13 season, he joined Lokomotive Leipzig, but terminated his contract after one season.

Red Bull Salzburg

Rose joined Red Bull Salzburg's U16 team in the 2013–14 season. When U18 coach Thomas Letsch joined FC Liefering, Rose succeeded him as U18 coach. The team won the Austrian U18 championship in his first season and the UEFA Youth League in April 2017 beating Benfica 2–1 in the final.

For the 2017–18 season, Rose succeeded Óscar García as head coach of RB Salzburg. In his first season, the team won the Austrian championship and reached the semi-finals of the Europa League, beating teams like Borussia Dortmund and Lazio. The final of the Austrian cup against Sturm Graz was lost. In the second season, RB Salzburg started the league with ten wins which broke the previous record of the league. In the Europa League, they reached the quarter final against Napoli. Rose never lost a home game during his tenure as head coach of Salzburg.

Borussia Mönchengladbach
For the 2019–20 season, Rose joined Borussia Mönchengladbach. In the 2020–21 UEFA Champions League, he managed to reach the knockout stages.

On 15 February 2021, Mönchengladbach announced that Rose would leave at the end of the season to join Borussia Dortmund.

Borussia Dortmund
In the 2021–22 season, Rose led Borussia Dortmund to a second-place finish in the Bundesliga. After one season in charge, he was sacked on 20 May 2022.

RB Leipzig
On 8 September, Rose was appointed as new RB Leipzig head coach. Two days later, he won his first match 3–0 against his former club Borussia Dortmund in the Bundesliga.

Managerial style
Rose has described the basic ideas of his playing style as "emotionality, hunger and being active". "We want to be very active against the ball, sprint a lot. We want to win high balls and have short ways to the goal. We don't want to play high and wide, but fast, dynamic and actively forward."

He has stated his preference for a 4–4–2 diamond, saying "I've always played a diamond when I've had the opportunity to do it, bringing in two strikers. Our system, even when we play with all three up front, is something like a diamond." However he has also used 4–3–3 and 4–2–3–1 formations at Mönchengladbach.

Personal life
Rose is a Christian, who joined the faith as an adult. His grandfather, Walter Rose, was also a footballer and played once for the Germany national team in 1937.

Managerial statistics

Honours

Player
Hannover 96
2. Bundesliga: 2001–02

Manager
Red Bull Salzburg Youth
UEFA Youth League: 2016–17

Red Bull Salzburg 
Austrian Bundesliga: 2017–18, 2018–19
Austrian Cup: 2018–19

References

External links

 

1976 births
Living people
Footballers from Leipzig
German footballers
Association football defenders
1. FC Lokomotive Leipzig players
Hannover 96 players
1. FSV Mainz 05 II players
1. FSV Mainz 05 players
2. Bundesliga players
Bundesliga players
German football managers
1. FC Lokomotive Leipzig managers
FC Red Bull Salzburg managers
Borussia Mönchengladbach managers
Borussia Dortmund managers
RB Leipzig managers
Austrian Football Bundesliga managers
Bundesliga managers
German expatriate football managers
Expatriate football managers in Austria
German expatriate sportspeople in Austria
German Christians
Converts to Christianity
East German footballers
People from Bezirk Leipzig